The Arab world protests may refer to the: 
Arab Spring
Arab World protests (2018–19), also known as "Arab Spring 2.0", "Arab Spring 2", "Arab Spring II", "Second Arab Spring", "2nd Arab Spring", and "New Arab Spring"